Batholomew Oluoma (born 5 October 1957) is a Nigerian weightlifter. He competed in the men's super heavyweight event at the 1984 Summer Olympics.

References

1957 births
Living people
Nigerian male weightlifters
Olympic weightlifters of Nigeria
Weightlifters at the 1984 Summer Olympics
Place of birth missing (living people)